The Palestinian minhag or Palestinian liturgy, (translit: Nusach Eretz Yisrael translation: "Rite or Prayer Service of The Land of Israel") as opposed to the Babylonian minhag, refers to the minhag (rite and ritual) of medieval Palestinian Jewry in relation to the traditional order and form of the prayers.

A complete collection has not been preserved from antiquity, but several passages of it are scattered in both the Babylonian and Jerusalem Talmuds, in the Midrashim, in the Pesiktot, in minor tractate Soferim, and in some responsa of the Palestinian Gaonate. Some excerpts have been preserved in the Siddur of Saadia Gaon and the Cairo Geniza yielded some important texts, such as the Amidah.

One fragment of a Palestinian siddur discovered in the genizah was written in Hebrew with various introductions and explanations in Judeo-Arabic dialects. The Geniza fragments mostly date from the 12th century, and reflect the usages of the Palestinian-rite synagogue in Cairo, which was founded by refugees from the Crusades.

Though the Jerusalem Talmud never became authoritative against the Babylonian, some elements of the Palestinian liturgy were destined to be accepted in Italy, Greece, Germany and France, even in Egypt, against the Babylonian, owing to the enthusiasm of the scholars of Rome. The Babylonian rite was accepted mainly in Spain, Portugal and the southern countries.

Liturgies incorporating some elements of the Palestinian minhag fall into three distinct groupings. 
The German ritual, itself divided into two rituals, the western or Minhag Ashkenaz and the eastern, or Minhag Polin. Minhag Ashkenaz was introduced in Palestine itself during the 16th century by German and Polish Kabbalists. 
The Italian minhag, perhaps the oldest Palestinian-influenced ritual.
Lastly the Romaniot minhag, more accurately, the Rumelic or Greek ritual; this ritual of the Balkan countries has retained the most features of the Palestinian minhag.

It has been argued that Saadia Gaon's siddur reflects at least some features of the Palestinian minhag and that this was one source of the liturgy of German Jewry. Another historic liturgy containing Palestinian elements is the old Aleppo rite (published Venice, 1527 and 1560).

This traditional view, that the Sephardi rite was derived from that of Babylon while the Ashkenazi rite reflects that of Palestine, goes back to Leopold Zunz, and was largely based on the fact that the Ashkenazi rite contains many piyyutim of Palestinian origin which are absent from the Babylonian and Sephardi rites. However, the correspondence is not complete. First, a few Sephardi usages in fact reflect Palestinian as against Babylonian influence, for example the use of the words morid ha-tal in the Amidah in summer months; and Moses Gaster maintained that the correspondence is the other way round (i.e. Ashkenazi=Babylonian, Sephardi=Palestinian). Secondly, Palestinian influence on any of the current Jewish rites extends only to isolated features, and none of them substantially follows the historic Palestinian rite.
 A comparative list of Babylonian and Palestinian customs, known as Hilluf Minhagim, is preserved from the time of the Geonim: most of the Palestinian customs there listed are not now practised in any community. The most important and long-lasting difference was that Torah reading in Palestinian-rite synagogues followed a triennial cycle, while other communities used an annual cycle.
 Similarly, Palestinian prayer texts recovered from the Cairo Geniza are not reflected in any current rite.

References

Further reading
 Fleischer, Ezra, Eretz-Yisrael Prayer and Prayer Rituals as Portrayed in the Geniza Documents (Hebrew), Jerusalem 1988
 Reif, Stefan, Judaism and Hebrew Prayer: Cambridge 1993. Hardback , ; Paperback , 
 Reif, Stefan, Problems with Prayers: Berlin and New York 2006 , 
 Wieder, Naphtali, The Formation of Jewish Liturgy: In the East and the West

External links
 Cambridge Genizah unit, search showing manuscripts of Palestinian rite

 
Minhagim
Nusachs